Phran Kratai is the northernmost district (amphoe) of Kamphaeng Phet province, central Thailand.

History
The name of the district translates to 'rabbit hunter' and refers to a local legend. A hunter (phran) surveyed southward to seek a strategic location to build a frontier city for Sukhothai Kingdom. When he spend the night in the area of the district, he found a golden haired rabbit (kratai) in front of a cave, which however quickly disappeared. The hunter reported his discovery to the King of Sukhothai and volunteered to catch the rabbit. He set a permanent village in front of the cave, but cannot catch the rabbit. Later more and more people moved to stay in the village. They called their village Ban Phran Kratai to commemorate the hunter.

Phran Kratai was made a district in 1895.

Geography
Neighboring districts are (from the southeast clockwise): Lan Krabue, Sai Ngam, Mueang Kamphaeng Phet, Kosamphi Nakhon of Kamphaeng Phet Province; Mueang Tak of Tak province; Ban Dan Lan Hoi and Khiri Mat of Sukhothai province.

Administration
The district is divided into 10 subdistricts (tambons), which are further subdivided into 116 villages (mubans). Phran Kratai is a subdistrict municipality (thesaban tambon) which covers parts of tambons Phran Kratai and Tham Kratai Thong. There are a further 10 tambon administrative organizations (TAO).

External links
amphoe.com (Thai)

Phran Kratai